Broken Heart is The Babys second album, released in September 1977. The album produced The Babys first big hit "Isn't It Time", which reached No. 13 on the Billboard Hot 100 and No. 9 on the Australian chart. in 1977. Broken Heart was later released as a double album with the self-titled album The Babys.

Album information
Producer Ron Nevison seemed to help create a clearer sound and the album ranges from frantic guitar and drum solos to quiet ballads like "Silver Dreams". Waite's vocals received greater attention than in the previous album where they sounded impressive but distant.

Sales of 400,0000 copies were reported for the album Broken Heart.

Songwriters outside the group were included with songs by Jack Conrad and Ray Kennedy, Mike Japp and Chas Sandford.

Track listing 
 "Wrong or Right" (John Waite) – 3:26
 "Give Me Your Love" (John Waite, Wally Stocker, Michael Corby, Tony Brock) – 3:37
 "Isn't It Time?" (Jack Conrad, Ray Kennedy) – 4:03
 "And If You Could See Me Fly" (John Waite, Tony Brock, Michael Corby, Wally Stocker) – 2:50
 "The Golden Mile" (John Waite, Tony Brock) – 5:01
 "Broken Heart" (John Waite) – 3:02
 "I'm Falling" (John Waite, Michael Corby) – 3:55
 "Rescue Me" (John Waite, Tony Brock, Michael Corby, Wally Stocker) – 3:50
 "Silver Dreams" (Tony Brock, John Waite) – 3:00
 "A Piece of the Action" (Mike Japp, Chas Sandford) – 4:35

Personnel 
 John Waite – bass, lead vocals (all but 9)
 Wally Stocker – lead guitar
 Michael Corby – keyboards, rhythm guitar 
 Tony Brock – drums, backing and lead (9) vocals, percussion, piano (9)

Additional personnel
 The Babettes (Lisa Freeman Roberts, Pat Henderson, Myrna Mathews) – backing vocals
 Alan MacMillan - string and horn arrangements
Technical
Recorded by Mike Beiriger, Pete Carlson, Ron Nevison
Charles William Bush - design, photography

References 

1977 albums
The Babys albums
Albums produced by Ron Nevison
Chrysalis Records albums